Patriarch Sergius may refer to:

Eastern Orthodox patriarchs 
Sergius of Bulgaria, Patriarch of Bulgaria c. 931 – c. 940
Patriarch Sergius I of Constantinople, Patriarch 610–638
Patriarch Sergius II of Constantinople, Patriarch 1001–1019
Patriarch Sergius I of Moscow, Patriarch 1943–1944

Other patriarchs
Sergius of Tella, Syriac Orthodox Patriarch of Antioch 544–546

Fictional patriarchs
Patriarch Sergius XVII, a character in Xenosaga